Nahri Shahi or Nahr-e-Shahi is a large district of Balkh province, Afghanistan around the capital district Mazari Sharif.

References

Districts of Balkh Province